Edward Earl Hartman (March 10, 1899 – March 5, 1974) was an American boxer who competed in the 1920 Summer Olympics. In 1920, he was eliminated in the quarterfinals of the bantamweight class after losing to the upcoming gold medalist Clarence Walker. Hartman was born in Philadelphia.

References

External links
 list of American boxers

1899 births
1974 deaths
Boxers from Philadelphia
Bantamweight boxers
Olympic boxers of the United States
Boxers at the 1920 Summer Olympics
American male boxers